Visoko Sport Airfield  is a public use airport located near Visoko, Bosnia and Herzegovina.

See also
List of airports in Bosnia and Herzegovina

References

External links 
 Airport record for Visoko Sport Airfield at Landings.com

Airports in Bosnia and Herzegovina